The Palladium Book of Contemporary Weapons is a 1984 role-playing game supplement published by Palladium Books.

Contents
The Palladium Book of Contemporary Weapons is a collection of the world's most famous and favorite firearms from 1930 to the present, and is organized into Automatic Pistols, Sub-Machine Guns, Rifles, Shotguns, and Machine Guns.

Reception
Jerry Epperson reviewed The Palladium Book of Contemporary Weapons in Space Gamer No. 70. Epperson commented that "If you have no interest in modern RPGs, obviously Contemporary Weapons will be of little interest to you. However, if you are looking to expand the firearm variety in your game, this aid is right on target."

Reviews
Different Worlds #39 (May/June, 1985)

References

Role-playing game books
Role-playing game supplements introduced in 1984